Scandia is an unincorporated community in Kitsap County, Washington.

References

Unincorporated communities in Kitsap County, Washington
Unincorporated communities in Washington (state)